Kuo Tzu-Ching 郭子敬 (born April 29, 1981 in Taipei, Taiwan) is a professional Magic: The Gathering player. Kuo is considered to be one of the best players in the Asia Pacific Region.

Kuo debuted at Pro Tour New York in 2000. Throughout his career, he has made the Top eight of 11 Grand Prix events. Kuo's lifetime winnings amount to $76,225, and he has also accumulated 252 lifetime Professional Points, putting him within the Top 50 in the world, and first in Asia Pacific.

In 2012, he became the World Champion at the very first World Magic Cup, alongside teammates Cheng Tung-Yi, Ivas Yang Yu Min and Paul Renie. In addition, he has made the Top 8 of Nationals eight times, been crowned National Champion five times and has five National Team appearances.

Kuo's highest Pro Tour finish is 10th, achieved during Pro Tour Avacyn Restored in Barcelona in 2012, a season that saw him achieve Platinum status, making him the first player in the Asia Pacific region to do so. He was invited to play in the exclusive 16-man Magic Players Championship 2012 as the Asia Pacific representative. In 2015, Kuo founded Game Square in Taipei, Taiwan, and it has since grown into one of Taiwan's first WPN Premier Stores.

Accomplishments

References

Magic: The Gathering players
Living people
1981 births
Sportspeople from Taipei